An automated trading system (ATS), a subset of algorithmic trading, uses a computer program to create buy and sell orders and automatically submits the orders to a market center or exchange. The computer program will automatically generate orders based on predefined set of rules using a trading strategy which is based on technical analysis, advanced statistical and mathematical computations or input from other electronic sources.

Automated trading systems are often used with electronic trading in automated market centers, including electronic communication networks, "dark pools", and automated exchanges. Automated trading systems and electronic trading platforms can execute repetitive tasks at speeds orders of magnitude greater than any human equivalent. Traditional risk controls and safeguards that relied on human judgment are not appropriate for automated trading and this has caused issues such as the 2010 Flash Crash.  New controls such as trading curbs or 'circuit breakers' have been put in place in some electronic markets to deal with automated trading systems.

Mechanism
The automated trading system determines whether an order should be submitted based on, for example, the current market price of an option and theoretical buy and sell prices. The theoretical buy and sell prices are derived from, among other things, the current market price of the security underlying the option. A look-up table stores a range of theoretical buy and sell prices for a given range of current market price of the underlying security. Accordingly, as the price of the underlying security changes, a new theoretical price may be indexed in the look-up table, thereby avoiding calculations that would otherwise slow automated trading decisions.
A distributed processing on-line automated trading system uses structured messages to represent each stage in the negotiation between a market maker (quoter) and a potential buyer or seller (requestor).

Advantages of Automated Trading System
Minimizes Emotion 
As orders are processed automatically once the pre-set rules are satisfied, emotional mistakes are minimized.
It also helps traders to stay disciplined when the market is highly volatile.

Ability to Backtest 
Before actually using the automated trading or the underlying algorithm, traders are able to evaluate their rules using the old data. 
It allows the traders to minimize potential mistakes and determine the expected returns.

Achieves Consistency 
As orders are processed only when the pre-set rules are satisfied and traders only trade by plan, it helps the traders achieve consistency.

Improved Order Entry Speed 
As computers process the orders as soon as the pre-set rules are met, it achieves higher order entry speed which is extremely beneficial in the current market where market conditions can change very rapidly.

Diversifies Trading 
Automated trading systems allow users to simultaneously trade in multiple accounts which allows them to diversify their portfolio. Diversifying the portfolio allows the users to minimize their risks by spreading the risk over various instruments.

Disadvantages of Automated Trading System
Mechanical Failures 
Even though the underlying algorithm is capable of performing well in the live market, an internet connection malfunction could lead to a failure.

Monitoring 
Although the computer is processing the orders, it still needs to be monitored because it is susceptible to technology failures as shown above.

Over-Optimization 
An algorithm that performs very well on backtesting could end up performing very poorly in the live market. Good performance on backtesting could lead to overly optimistic expectations from the traders which could lead to big failures.

Strategies
Trend following
"The most common strategy which is implemented by following the trend in moving averages, channel breakouts, price level movements, and related technical indicators".

For example, the following formula could be used for trend following strategy:
"Consider a complete probability space (Ω, F, P). Let  denote the stock price at time  satisfying the equation

  ,

Volume-weighted average price
"Volume weighted average price strategy breaks up a large order and releases dynamically determined smaller chunks of the order to the market using stock-specific historical volume profiles."

According to Volume-weighted average price Wikipedia page, VWAP is calculated using the following formula:

":

where:
 is Volume Weighted Average Price;
 is price of trade ;
 is quantity of trade ;
 is each individual trade that takes place over the defined period of time, excluding cross trades and basket cross trades".

Mean reversion (finance)
This strategy is based on the idea that the values/prices of assets will revert to their mean prices/values.

"A continuous mean-reverting time series can be represented by an Ornstein-Uhlenbeck stochastic differential equation:

History 
The concept of automated trading system was first introduced by Richard Donchian in 1949 when he used a set of rules to buy and sell the funds. Then, in the 1980s, the concept of rule based trading became more popular when famous traders like John Henry began to use such strategies. In the mid 1990s, some models were available for purchase. Also, improvements in technology increased the accessibility for retail investors.
The early form of an Automated Trading System, composed of software based on algorithms, that have historically been used by financial managers and brokers. This type of software was used to automatically manage clients' portfolios. However, the first service to free market without any supervision was first launched in 2008 which was Betterment by Jon Stein. Since then, this system has been improving with the development in the IT industry. Now, Automated Trading System is managing huge assets all around the globe. In 2014, more than 75 percent of the stock shares traded on United States exchanges (including the New York Stock Exchange and NASDAQ) originated from automated trading system orders.

Applications 
How it Works
Automated trading system can be based on a predefined set of rules which determine when to enter an order, when to exit a position, and how much money to invest in each trading product. Trading strategies differ such that while some are designed to pick market tops and bottoms, others follow a trend, and others involve complex strategies including randomizing orders to make them less visible in the marketplace. ATSs allow a trader to execute orders much quicker and to manage their portfolio easily by automatically generating protective precautions.

Backtesting
Backtesting of a trading system involves programmers running the program by using historical market data in order to determine whether the underlying algorithm can produce the expected results. Backtesting software enables a trading system designer to develop and test their trading systems by using historical market data and optimizing the results obtained with the historical data. Although backtesting of automated trading systems cannot accurately determine future results, an automated trading system can be backtested by using historical prices to see how the system would have performed theoretically if it had been active in a past market environment.

Forward Testing
Forward testing of an algorithm can also be achieved using simulated trading with real-time market data to help confirm the effectiveness of the trading strategy in the current market. It may be used to reveal issues inherent in the computer code.

Live Testing
Live testing is the final stage of the development cycle. In this stage, live performance is compared against the backtested and walk forward results. Metrics compared include Percent Profitable, Profit Factor, Maximum Drawdown and Average Gain per Trade. The goal of an automated trading system is to meet or exceed the backtested performance with a high efficiency rating.

Market disruption and manipulation 

Automated trading, or high-frequency trading, causes regulatory concerns as a contributor to market fragility. United States regulators have published releases discussing several types of risk controls that could be used to limit the extent of such disruptions, including financial and regulatory controls to prevent the entry of erroneous orders as a result of computer malfunction or human error, the breaching of various regulatory requirements, and exceeding a credit or capital limit.

The use of high-frequency trading (HFT) strategies has grown substantially over the past several years and drives a significant portion of activity on U.S. markets. Although many HFT strategies are legitimate, some are not and may be used for manipulative trading. A strategy would be illegitimate or even illegal if it causes deliberate disruption in the market or tries to manipulate it. Such strategies include "momentum ignition strategies": spoofing and layering where a market participant places a non-bona fide order on one side of the market (typically, but not always, above the offer or below the bid) in an attempt to bait other market participants to react to the non-bona fide order and then trade with another order on the other side of the market. They are also referred to as predatory/abusive strategies. Given the scale of the potential impact that these practices may have, the surveillance of abusive algorithms remains a high priority for regulators. The Financial Industry Regulatory Authority (FINRA) has reminded firms using HFT strategies and other trading algorithms of their obligation to be vigilant when testing these strategies pre- and post-launch to ensure that the strategies do not result in abusive trading.

FINRA also focuses on the entry of problematic HFT and algorithmic activity through sponsored participants who initiate their activity from outside of the United States. In this regard, FINRA reminds firms of their surveillance and control obligations under the SEC's Market Access Rule and Notice to Members 04-66, as well as potential issues related to treating such accounts as customer accounts, anti-money laundering, and margin levels as highlighted in Regulatory Notice 10-18  and the SEC's Office of Compliance Inspections and Examination's National Exam Risk Alert dated September 29, 2011.

FINRA conducts surveillance to identify cross-market and cross-product manipulation of the price of underlying equity securities. Such manipulations are done typically through abusive trading algorithms or strategies that close out pre-existing option positions at favorable prices or establish new option positions at advantageous prices.

In recent years, there have been a number of algorithmic trading malfunctions that caused substantial market disruptions. These raise concern about firms' ability to develop, implement, and effectively supervise their automated systems. FINRA has stated that it will assess whether firms' testing and controls related to algorithmic trading and other automated trading strategies are adequate in light of the U.S. Securities and Exchange Commission and firms' supervisory obligations. This assessment may take the form of examinations and targeted investigations. Firms will be required to address whether they conduct separate, independent, and robust pre-implementation testing of algorithms and trading systems. Also, whether the firm's legal, compliance, and operations staff are reviewing the design and development of the algorithms and trading systems for compliance with legal requirements will be investigated. FINRA will review whether a firm actively monitors and reviews algorithms and trading systems once they are placed into production systems and after they have been modified, including procedures and controls used to detect potential trading abuses such as wash sales, marking, layering, and momentum ignition strategies. Finally, firms will need to describe their approach to firm-wide disconnect or "kill" switches, as well as procedures for responding to catastrophic system malfunctions.

Notable examples 
Examples of recent substantial market disruptions include the following:
 On May 6, 2010, the Dow Jones Industrial Average declined about 1,000 points (about 9 percent) and recovered those losses within minutes. It was the second-largest point swing (1,010.14 points) and the largest one-day point decline (998.5 points) on an intraday basis in the Average's history. This market disruption became known as the Flash Crash and resulted in U.S. regulators issuing new regulations to control market access achieved through automated trading.
 On August 1, 2012, between 9:30 a.m. and 10:00 a.m. EDT, Knight Capital Group lost four times its 2011 net income. Knight's CEO Thomas Joyce stated, on the day after the market disruption, that the firm had "all hands on deck" to fix a bug in one of Knight's trading algorithms that submitted erroneous orders to exchanges for nearly 150 different stocks. Trading volumes soared in so many issues, that the SPDR S&P 500 ETF (SYMBOL: SPY), which is generally the most heavily traded U.S. security, became the 52nd-most traded stock on that day, according to Eric Hunsader, CEO of market data service Nanex. Knight shares closed down 62 percent as a result of the trading error and Knight Capital nearly collapsed. Knight ultimately reached an agreement to merge with Getco, a Chicago-based high-speed trading firm.

See also 
 High-frequency trading
 Algorithmic trading
 Day trading software
 Technical analysis software
Systematic trading

References 

Share trading
Financial software
Electronic trading systems
Algorithmic trading